Ibrahima Diomandé (born 28 October 1969) is an Ivorian footballer. He played in 23 matches for the Ivory Coast national football team from 1995 to 1999. He was also named in Ivory Coast's squad for the 1998 African Cup of Nations tournament.

References

External links
 
 

1969 births
Living people
Ivorian footballers
Ivory Coast international footballers
1998 African Cup of Nations players
People from Sassandra-Marahoué District
Association football defenders
ASEC Mimosas players
Africa Sports d'Abidjan players
JC d'Abidjan players